Tite is one of four Sectors of Quinara Region of Guinea-Bissau. It has an area of 699.5 km2.

References

Populated places in Guinea-Bissau
Quinara Region
Sectors of Guinea-Bissau